The 1964 Australia rugby union tour of New Zealand  was a series of eight matches played by the Australia national rugby union team in August 1964.

The "Wallabies " lost the series, winning one test out of three against the All Blacks but losing the other two. So the Bledisloe Cup, contested for the first time since 1962, remain owned by New Zealand.

The tour was one of the highlights of the successful "Thornett Era" of Australian Rugby, buoyed by the leadership skills of skipper John Thornett and the outstanding skills of greats of the game like Ken Catchpole, Peter Johnson and Rob Heming. Dick Marks and Peter Crittle also toured and would later become among the most influential administrators of Australian rugby.

The Matches 
Scores and results list Australia's points tally first.

References

Australia national rugby union team tours of New Zealand
tour
tour
August 1964 sports events in New Zealand